Ciara Renée Harper (born October 19, 1990) is an American actress and musician. She is best known for her roles on Broadway as The Witch in Big Fish, the Leading Player in Pippin, and Elsa in Frozen. She played Esmeralda in The Hunchback of Notre Dame at Paper Mill Playhouse and La Jolla Playhouse. She starred as Kendra Saunders / Hawkgirl in the CW series DC's Legends of Tomorrow, a spin-off of Arrow and The Flash. Her vocal type is mezzo-soprano.

Early life
Renée was born and raised in Harrisburg, Pennsylvania. She attended Central Dauphin East High School and graduated with a degree in Music Theatre from Baldwin Wallace University in 2013.

Career
In fall September 2013, Renée made her Broadway debut at the Neil Simon Theatre as The Witch in Big Fish after working in a pre-Broadway workshop of Bull Durham. In February of the following year, she was cast in a revival of the musical Pippin, replacing Patina Miller as the Leading Player. Renée guest-starred on Law & Order: SVU in the fall of 2014 on NBC. Based on the Victor Hugo novel and animated Disney film of the same name, Renée took on the role of Esmeralda in a musical adaptation of The Hunchback of Notre Dame at the Paper Mill Playhouse in association with the La Jolla Playhouse from March 15 to April 5 of 2015, a performance the NY Daily News described as "earthy and lovely". In March 2015, it was announced that Renée had been cast as Kendra Saunders / Hawkgirl in The CW's spin-off series DC's Legends of Tomorrow, an expansion of the network's existing universe of DC Comics adaptations. She joined co-stars Caity Lotz, Brandon Routh, Franz Drameh, Dominic Purcell, Victor Garber, Wentworth Miller, and Arthur Darvill. Renée made a special guest appearance as Kendra Saunders on the first-season finale of The Flash on May 20, 2015.

In 2016, Renée played Susan in the Off-Broadway revival of Jonathan Larson's autobiographical musical Tick, Tick... Boom!. The production ran from October 20 to December 18.

In the summer of 2017, she played Mary Magdalene in the Andrew Lloyd Webber musical Jesus Christ Superstar at The Muny in St. Louis, Missouri.

It was announced on January 15, 2020 that Renee will return to Broadway to play Elsa in Frozen beginning February 18. However, due to the COVID-19 pandemic, all Broadway theatres were closed in March 2020. Disney later announced Frozen will not reopen after the lockdown is lifted.

Renee replaced country singer Jennifer Nettles as Jenna in the Broadway musical Waitress on November 25, 2021.

Personal life
Ciara's mother's heritage comes from a mix of European cultures. Her father's heritage comes from African, Middle Eastern, Native American, and European cultures.

Filmography

Theatre

References

External links
 

Living people
1990 births
Musicians from Pennsylvania
American television actresses
American musical theatre actresses
American mezzo-sopranos
21st-century American actresses
African-American actresses
American people who self-identify as being of Native American descent
American people of European descent
21st-century African-American women singers